Foul Bay (Spanish: Bahia Sucia) is an inlet on East Falkland island in the Falkland Islands. It is in the north west of the island, between Concordia Bay and San Carlos Water, and the northern end of Falkland Sound. It is also near Cape Dolphin.

References

Bays of East Falkland